Left of center may refer to:
Left of Center (album), released in 2006 by Javier Colon
"Left of Center" (Suzanne Vega song), a 1986 song by Suzanne Vega
Left of Center (Turkey), a political ideology in Turkey

See also
Centre-left politics, a political view in left–right politics
Left-wing politics, a second political view